Richard Frece (born 9 August 1975) is an Austrian diver. He competed at the 1996 Summer Olympics and the 2000 Summer Olympics.

References

External links
 

1975 births
Living people
Austrian male divers
Olympic divers of Austria
Divers at the 1996 Summer Olympics
Divers at the 2000 Summer Olympics
Divers from Vienna